WinAPIOverride is an API hooking software. It can be used to call functions from DLLs.

This software has 32-bit and 64-bit version. The name of the 32-bit version is WinAPIOverride32 and the name of the 64-bit version is WinAPIOverride64.

External links
 WinAPIOverride website

Debuggers
Freeware
Programming tools for Windows